The 2011 WSBL season was the 23rd season of the Women's State Basketball League (SBL). The regular season began on Friday 18 March and ended on Saturday 23 July. The finals began on Friday 29 July and ended on Friday 26 August, when the Willetton Tigers defeated the East Perth Eagles in the WSBL Grand Final.

Regular season
The regular season began on Friday 18 March and ended on Saturday 23 July after 19 rounds of competition.

Standings

Finals
The finals began on Friday 29 July and ended on Friday 26 August with the WSBL Grand Final.

Bracket

Awards

Player of the Week

Statistics leaders

Regular season
 Most Valuable Player: Casey Mihovilovich (Mandurah Magic)
 Coach of the Year: Anthony Fletcher (East Perth Eagles)
 Most Improved Player: Rosie Tobin (Perry Lakes Hawks)
 All-Star Five:
 PG: Kate Malpass (Willetton Tigers)
 SG: Casey Mihovilovich (Mandurah Magic)
 SF: Jasmine Hooper (Willetton Tigers)
 PF: Leah Rush (Kalamunda Eastern Suns)
 C: Samantha Norwood (East Perth Eagles)

Finals
 Grand Final MVP: Kate Malpass (Willetton Tigers)

References

External links
 2011 fixtures
 WSBL Power Rankings

2011
2010–11 in Australian basketball
2011–12 in Australian basketball